Cymindis pallidula is a species of ground beetle in the subfamily Harpalinae. It was described by Chaudoir in 1846.

References

pallidula
Beetles described in 1846